The Anglo-Omani Society (Arabic: الجمعية البريطانية العمانية), is a London-based charitable organisation registered in the UK. It seeks to promote and sustain relations between Britain and the Sultanate of Oman. Membership of the society is open to Omani and British nationals who have lived in Oman or who have commercial, cultural or other interests in the Sultanate.

The Society's Objectives
The Society seeks:
 To advance the education of the British public about all aspects of Oman.
 To advance the education of Omani nationals about all aspects of the UK.
 To improve understanding between Oman and the UK and to promote a lasting friendship between the UK and Oman.
 To provide bursaries, scholarships and grants for Omani and British students and projects.

The society has a calendar of general interest and specialist lectures scheduled throughout the year held at its London headquarters in 34 Sackville Street. It also holds a number of social events throughout the year attended by British and Omani dignitaries and society members.

One of the ways the society seeks to keep the friendly relations between the UK and Oman healthy is by actively encouraging links between the young people of both nations. The society's New Generation Group is the main vehicle for this engagement through exchange visits and events in both countries.

The society retains strong links with academic institutions in the UK and Oman e.g. the Sultan Qaboos University, St Antony's College, Oxford and the University of Exeter to name but a few.

The society also maintains close relations with other friendship groups that have members who have spent time in the Sultanate, e.g. the Sultan's Armed Forces Association.

Omani British Business Council (OBBC)
The OBBC was formed to promote the close economic and commercial relationship between the Sultanate of Oman and United Kingdom and to develop bilateral trade, investment and other economic partnerships between the two countries.

The Society's Records
The society's records are held as archived material at St Antony's College Middle East Centre Archive in Oxford.

A regular review of the society's activities is produced as an annual magazine, which is available on-line.

Current Chairman
 Stuart Laing - a retired UK diplomat with considerable experience of the Middle East.

Previous Chairmen
The following are recorded as having held the post of society chairman:
 Robert Alston CMG QSO DL.
 Richard Muir CMG
 Sir Terence Clark KBE CMG CVO
 Ivor Lucas
 Gordon Calver
 Donald Orde
 Sir Donald Hawley KCMG MBE - first chairman.

The Society's Governance

Vice-Presidents

There are currently five vice-presidents who have normally fulfilled other senior posts in the society prior to their appointment. These are supported by the chairman (see above), a vice-chairman, a treasurer, a company secretary and a board of trustees (see below).

Trustees

The board of trustees is composed of six society members, with additional co-opted members from the Embassy of Oman and the UK Foreign & Commonwealth Office.

See also
 Oman
 St Antony's College, Oxford
 Embassy of Oman, London

References 

United Kingdom friendship associations
1976 establishments in the United Kingdom
Organizations established in 1976
Non-profit organisations based in London